Linda Grubben (née Linda Tjørhom; 13 September 1979 in Stavanger) is a retired Norwegian biathlete.

She won a silver medal at the 2002 Winter Olympics in the 4 × 7.5 km relay, while winning the gold medal at the Biathlon World Championships 2004 in Oberhof, 2004. Individually, she won the bronze medal at the 15 km of the Biathlon World Championship 2005 in Hochfilzen. Grubben won the last race of the 2005-06 Biathlon World Cup in Oslo, capturing the third position in the overall rankings. She accumulated eight World Cup victories in her career. At the World Championships taking place in Antholz-Anterselva, she collected bronze, silver and gold medals. The gold medal was secured by hitting 20 out of 20 possible targets.

On 5 August 2006, she married Norwegian national biathlon coach Roger Grubben, adopting his last name, Grubben. In December 2007 she gave birth to their first child - a daughter.

After winning her third medal which was a bronze at the 2007 World Championships, she announced her retirement from the sport.

References
IBU Profile

External links
 

1979 births
Living people
Sportspeople from Stavanger
Norwegian female biathletes
Biathletes at the 2002 Winter Olympics
Biathletes at the 2006 Winter Olympics
Olympic biathletes of Norway
Medalists at the 2002 Winter Olympics
Olympic medalists in biathlon
Olympic silver medalists for Norway
Biathlon World Championships medalists
Holmenkollen Ski Festival winners
21st-century Norwegian women